F.M. Palacios Field is a multi-use stadium in Saipan, Northern Mariana Islands.  It is currently used mostly for baseball matches.  The stadium holds 3,000 people.

Baseball venues in insular areas of the United States
Saipan
Sports venues in the Northern Mariana Islands
Baseball in the Northern Mariana Islands
Baseball venues in Oceania